Skyberg is an unincorporated community in Kenyon Township, Goodhue County, Minnesota, United States.

The community is located southeast of Kenyon at the junction of State Highway 56 (MN 56) and County 11 Boulevard.

Skyberg is located five miles southeast of Kenyon, and four miles north of West Concord.

References

Unincorporated communities in Minnesota
Unincorporated communities in Goodhue County, Minnesota